Dunans refers to a former estate in Glendaruel, Cowal, Scotland.
Structures with the name include:
Dunans Castle, formerly Dunans house.
Dunans Bridge, a Thomas Telford bridge, the latest of a number of bridges on the same site.

Clan Fletcher